Belgium as host country chose their Junior Eurovision entry for 2005 through Eurokids, a national final consisting of 12 songs competing over two semi-finals and a final. The winner of Eurokids was Lindsay Daenen with the song "Mes rêves".

Before Junior Eurovision

Eurokids 2005 
Eurokids 2005 was the national final for Belgium at the Junior Eurovision Song Contest 2005, organised by the two Belgian broadcasters: Flemish broadcaster Vlaamse Radio- en Televisieomroep (VRT) and Walloon broadcaster Radio télévision belge de la communauté française (RTBF).

Format 
The format of the competition consisted of three shows: two semi-finals and a final. Each broadcaster chose six songs to compete, with the final winner representing Belgium at the contest. From the semi-finals, the best scoring three French speaking and three Dutch speaking participants advanced to the final. In all shows, the results were based on the votes from a four-member adult "expert" jury, a kids jury, a radio jury and televoting. The televote counted for 2/5 of the overall vote, with the other 3 juries counting for 1/5. The "expert" jury consisted of two members from Flanders and another two from Wallonia: Marcel Vanthilt, André Vermeulen, Mélanie Cohl and Viktor Lazlo.

Semi-final 1
The first semi-final took place on 4 September 2005.

Semi-final 2
The second semi-final took place on 11 September 2005.

Final 
The final was held on 18 September 2005. The winner was "Mes rêves" performed by Lindsay.

At Junior Eurovision 
At Junior Eurovision, Belgium performed in twelfth position, before Malta and after Latvia. Belgium placed in 10th position with 63 points; the highest of which was 12 points, which came from the Netherlands.

Voting

Notes

References

External links 
 Official Belgian JESC Site

Junior Eurovision Song Contest
2005
Belgium